Cornus wilsoniana, called ghost dogwood or Wilson's dogwood, is species of Cornus native to central and southeastern China. A tree typically 5 to 10m, rarely reaching 40m, it has leaves with white undersides, profuse white flowers in May, and striking grey–green mottled bark on mature specimens. The purplishblack fruit are harvested for vegetable oil, the leaves are used for fodder, and the timber is valued for tools and furniture. Its well-shaped crown and attractive bark has led to proposals that it be developed as a street tree.

References

External links
 

wilsoniana
Trees of China
Endemic flora of China
Plants described in 1908